The Leo II Groups, or Leo II Cloud, are a series of at least 110 galactic clusters and individual galaxies stretching approximately 30 Mly (9.2 Mpc) off the right edge of the Virgo Supercluster.

These clusters include:
NGC 3166 Group
AGC 208443
AGC 208444
AGC 208457
AGC 208535
AGC 208537
NGC 3156
NGC 3165
NGC 3166
NGC 3169
NGC 3190 Group
NGC 3162
NGC 3177
NGC 3185
NGC 3187
NGC 3190
NGC 3193
UGC 5574
NGC 3227 Group
NGC 3213
NGC 3226
NGC 3227
UGC 5675
NGC 3254 Group
NGC 3245A
NGC 3245
NGC 3254
NGC 3265
NGC 3277
NGC 3338 Group
NGC 3338
NGC 3346
NGC 3389
UGC 5832
NGC 3370 Group
NGC 3370
NGC 3443
NGC 3447
NGC 3447A
NGC 3454
NGC 3455
NGC 3457
UGC 5945
NGC 3396 Group
IC 2604
NGC 3381
NGC 3395
NGC 3396
NGC 3424
NGC 3430
NGC 3442
NGC 3504 Group
NGC 3380
NGC 3400
NGC 3414
NGC 3418
NGC 3451
NGC 3504
NGC 3512
UGC 5921
NGC 3607 Group (Leo II Group)
NGC 3501
NGC 3507
NGC 3592
NGC 3605
NGC 3607
NGC 3608
NGC 3626
NGC 3655
NGC 3659
NGC 3681
NGC 3684
NGC 3686
NGC 3691
UGC 6112
UGC 6171
NGC 3640 Group
NGC 3630
NGC 3640
NGC 3664
NGC 3813 Group
NGC 3755
NGC 3813
UGC 6603
NGC 3810 Group
NGC 3773
NGC 3810
Additional galaxies in the group:
NGC 3098
NGC 3279
NGC 3287
NGC 3294
NGC 3301
NGC 3365
NGC 3423
NGC 3437
NGC 3485
NGC 3495
NGC 3547
NGC 3596
NGC 3666
NGC 3705
UGC 5633
UGC 5708
UGC 6670

See also
M96 Group
Virgo II Groups
Virgo III Groups

References

Galaxy clusters
Virgo Supercluster